Swami Ramanand Tirtha (or Teerth; IAST: Svāmi Rāmanand Tīrta; 3 October 1903 – 22 January 1972) was an Indian politician, freedom fighter, educator and social activist who led the Hyderabad liberation struggle during the reign of Osman Ali Khan, the last Nizam of Hyderabad State. Swami Ramanand Tirtha was the principal leader of the Hyderabad State Congress. Before taking Sanyasa, his family name was Vyenkatesh Bhagvanrao Khedgikar.

Family
Despite taking Sannyassa or the pledge of renunciation, Swami Ramananda continued to work with the members of the Khedgikar family on his paternal side. His younger brother Bhimrao Bhagvanrao Khedgikar was a renowned educator who settled in the town of Ambajogai, Maharashtra on Swamiji's suggestion and worked with Swami Ramananda to help establish the Shri Yogeshwari Shikshan Sanstha. Other members of the family include Dr. Shirish Bhimrao Khedgikar and Dr.Dilip Bhimrao Khedgikar. The Son of Dr. Shirish Bhimrao Khedgikar, Shamil Shirish Khedgikar, is an alumnus of School Planning and Architecture Delhi and Cornell University, where he pursued graduate studies in Urban Planning. Since Swami Ramananda had no next of kin, these members of the family have continued working towards preserving Swami Ramananda Tirth's legacy of providing education to rural and underprivileged communities as members of the Swami Ramananda Tirth Trust and the Swami Ramananda Tirth Rural Institute.

Life
Swami Ramanand Tirtha fought the Osman Ali Khan, Asaf Jah VII, the Nizam of Hyderabad, after the Hyderabad State Congress was established in 1938. He participated in Satyagrahas ("non-violent resistance" campaigns) and was imprisoned for 111 days by Osman Ali Khan. Swami Ramanand Tirtha is credited for having created a revolutionary movement to integrate Hyderabad State with the Indian Union in 1948. Swami Ramanand Tirtha's ability to galvanize the people in concert with the decisive military victory of the Hyderabad Police Action are credited with the state's successful integration into the India Union.

Swamiji had communist leanings initially, but would later take the renunciant vows of the Hindu sannyasi ("ascetic", "monk") tradition. His original name was Vyenkatesh Bhagvanrao Khedgikar.  He was given the name "Swami Ramanand Tirtha" after taking the sanyas initiation of voluntary bachelorship for the remainder of his life. Swami Ramanand Tirtha is said to have taken sanyas at the villages of Hipparge Rava, Taluka- Lohara and the District of Osmanabad.

Swami Ramanand Tirtha first established Rashtriya Shala ("The National School") at Hipparge Rava. He also worked as a teacher in Ausa in Latur district.

Memorials

Dr. P.V.Narasimha Rao, former Prime Minister of India started "Swami Ramananda Teerth Memorial" in Hyderabad. Swamiji's mortal remains are resting here in the premises at Brahmanvada, Begumpet, Hyderabad. Several other eminent people from Maharashtra, Telangana, Karnataka, were his followers. Several of them headed mostly congressional governments in their respective states. Some have served in the Central Cabinet, too.

The Swami Ramanand Teerth Marathwada University, Nanded which servers the southern part of Marathwada Region of Maharashtra State, specifically to the districts of Nanded, Latur, Parbhani and Hingoli has been named after him. The university, set up in 1994, has 172 colleges affiliated to it.

References

Further reading
 
 Hyderabad Swatantrasangramachya Aathavani by Swami Ramanand Teerth

1903 births
1972 deaths
Hindu activists
India MPs 1957–1962
Marathi politicians
History of Latur
People from Latur
People from Hyderabad State
Indian independence activists from Maharashtra
Lok Sabha members from Maharashtra
People from Marathwada
Indian National Congress politicians